Kondaveeti Raja is a 1986 Telugu film starring Chiranjeevi, Vijayashanti, Radha and Rao Gopal Rao. This film was directed by K. Raghavendra Rao. The film released on 31 January 1986.

Plot
The film begins with Raja coming to a historic village called Rathnagiri in search of some work. There is an old fort in this village and every one in that village believes that there is a hidden treasure inside. Sarvarayudu, a rich man in the village, tries every possible way to explore that treasure. He unearths the secret of this hidden treasure. Raja becomes a problem for Sarvarayudu by interfering in all his misdeeds. Unexpectedly, Raja's sister's daughter Padma is in the same village and she meets Raja to gives her heart to him. But Raja falls in love with another village belle, Rani. Raja realizes the truth that it was Sarvarayudu who killed his sister and plans to take revenge for his sister's murder. He succeeds in his attempts at the cost of Rani's love, who sacrifices her love to help Raja. The hidden treasure is recovered and handed over to the government, and Raja and Padma marry.

Cast
 Chiranjeevi as Raja
 Vijayashanti as Rani
 Radha as Padma
 Rao Gopala Rao as Papa Rao
 Kaikala Satyanarayana as Venkatrayudu
 Nirmalamma as Parvatamma
 Nutan Prasad as Sarva Rayudu
 Y. Vijaya
 Chalapati Rao
 P. L. Narayana
 Rallapalli as Markata Sastry
 Mada Venkateswara Rao
 Chitti Babu
 P. J. Sarma

References

External links

1986 films
Films directed by K. Raghavendra Rao
Films scored by K. Chakravarthy
1980s Telugu-language films